Weli Point is a jutting headland overlooking Wahiawa bay on the south coast of the island of Kauai in the Hawaiian Islands.

External links

Headlands of Kauai